Valascia was an indoor sporting arena located in Ambrì, Switzerland. The capacity of the arena was 6,500 and was built in 1959. It served as the home arena of the HC Ambri-Piotta ice hockey team of the National League (NL) from 1959 to 2021. The ends of the arena were open air, making hockey being played there partially outdoor.

The team moved into the newly built arena for the 2021/22 season. The Valascia was then demolished as it was located in a potential avalanche path.

Closure
Construction for the new arena was scheduled to begin in July 2017 before being postponed to a later date. Should construction not begin before the summer of 2018, Ambri-Piotta will no longer be allowed to play in the National League. Renovation isn't possible as it would bring the total capacity below the required 6,000 to compete in the National League and the arena would still face danger from potential avalanches. Therefore, the new Valascia must be ready to open in time for the 2020/21 NL season should Ambri-Piotta wishes to remain in Switzerland's top league.

On August 30, 2018, HC Ambri-Piotta announced that construction for the new Valascia is set to begin in October 2018 and should be ready to open by 2021.

After multiple delays, construction officially began in April 2019, with completion due for the start of the 2021/22 season.

On April 5, 2021, Ambri-Piotta played its final game in the Valascia, a 2–3 loss to HC Fribourg-Gottéron, behind closed doors.

See also
Piotta
Ambrì Airport
Ambrì-Piotta railway station

References

External links

Venue information

Indoor ice hockey venues in Switzerland
1959 establishments in Switzerland
Sports venues completed in 1959
2021 disestablishments in Switzerland
Sports venues demolished in 2021
20th-century architecture in Switzerland